Blood Sutra is an album by pianist Vijay Iyer recorded in 2003 and originally released on the Artists House label before being reissued on Pi Recordings in 2006.

Reception

The AllMusic review by Thom Jurek said, "Blood Sutra only adds more luster to Iyer's presence on the short list of forward-looking jazz creators these days. His muse still tends towards the severe but there's no denying the individuality and the fact he doesn't make the listening easy is also precisely what makes it so rewarding". Writing for All About Jazz, Dan McCleneghan observed, "An initial listen to Blood Sutra had me thinking "no new ground broken here" since Panoptic Modes and You Life Flashes (Pi Records, 2002) by Fieldwork, an Iyer trio vehicle. But a "sit down and concentrate on the sounds" session reveals nuances and subtle shadings creeping in ... Vijay Iyer evolves in fascinating fashion". The JazzTimes review by Nate Chinen noted, "This is exciting and eminently listenable stuff, intuitive in bearing and dynamic in execution.

An essential for adventurous listeners, Blood Sutra could also serve as an ideal introduction to Iyer's burgeoning oeuvre".

Track listing
All compositions by Vijay Iyer except where noted
 "Proximity (Crossroads)" – 2:12
 "Brute Facts" – 6:10
 "Habeas Corpus" – 5:58
 "Ascent" – 1:22
 "When History Sleeps" – 6:07
 "Questions of Agency" – 5:11
 "Kinship" – 6:10
 "Stigmatism" – 4:02
 "That Much Music" – 2:31
 "Imagined Nations" – 6:11
 "Because of Guns (Hey Joe Redux)" – 7:47 contains elements of "Hey Joe" by Billy Roberts
 "Desiring" – 4:34

Personnel
 Vijay Iyer – piano
 Rudresh Mahanthappa – alto saxophone
 Stefan Crump – bass
 Tyshawn Sorey – drums

References

2003 albums
Vijay Iyer albums
Artists House albums
Pi Recordings albums